Greater Binghamton FC (GBFC) was an American soccer team located in Binghamton, New York. The team was established in 2012.

The team played its home games out of the Greater Binghamton Sports Complex.

History
Greater Binghamton Futbol Club (GBFC) was founded in 2012 in Binghamton, New York to compete in the National Premier Soccer League (NPSL), the fourth tier of the American soccer pyramid and roughly equivalent with the USL Premier Development League (PDL). The team played their first game on May 13, 2012 a 2-2 draw away against AFC Cleveland.

In their second season, GBFC finished 1st in the Keystone Conference during the regular season with a record of 10-2-2, going on to defeat the New York Red Bulls NPSL squad 2-1 in Binghamton, but ultimately losing to defending NPSL champions, Lehigh Valley United, 1-0 in the Northeast Region finals.

Year-by-year

Stadium
 The Dome at Greater Binghamton Sports Complex; Binghamton, New York

References

External links
 

National Premier Soccer League teams
Amateur soccer teams in the United States
Defunct soccer clubs in New York (state)
2012 establishments in New York (state)
Association football clubs established in 2012
Sports in Binghamton, New York
Association football clubs disestablished in 2018
2018 disestablishments in New York (state)